Vital Signs is a British television drama series which aired on ITV1 in 2006. It stars Tamzin Outhwaite as a supermarket check-out operator who decides to become a doctor. The series co-stars William Beck, Fraser Ayres, Eve Best, Claudie Blakley, Lucinda Dryzek, Beth Goddard, Alfie Hunter, Brooke Kinsella, Harry Lloyd, Peter Rnic and Steven Waddington. The filming of the show is based in numerous London hospitals and medical schools; predominantly the show has been shot in St George's Hospital and Medical School.

The theme tune, 'Go My Own Way', was written and recorded by Alexis Strum, and produced by Magnus Fiennes.

External links

2006 British television series debuts
2006 British television series endings
2000s British drama television series
ITV television dramas
2000s British medical television series
2000s British television miniseries
Television series by Endemol
Television series by Tiger Aspect Productions
English-language television shows